Toone or To1 may refer to:

People with the surname
 Ella Toone (born 1999), English association football player
 Geoffrey Toone (1910–1995), Irish actor
 Philip Toone (born 1965), Canadian politician
 Spencer Toone (born 1985), American football player
 Tim Toone (born 1985), American football player

Places
 Toone, Tennessee

Arts
 Royal Theatre of Toone, a puppet theatre in Brussels, Belgium

Others
 To1, a South Korean boy band, formerly known as TOO